Zachary Michael Anderson (born 30 April 1991) is a retired Australian professional football player who played as a centre back.

Born in Queensland, Anderson made his professional debut with Gold Coast United FC in 2009 before joining the Mariners in 2012, and then Sydney FC in 2015. He moved to the UAE in 2016 to play for Emirates Club, before moving to Malaysia six months later.

He has played for the Australian U-20 and U-23 sides.

Club career

Gold Coast United
On 20 November 2009, Anderson made his senior debut for Gold Coast United FC in the starting 11, in a 1–1 draw against Adelaide United. He scored his first goal for the club in a win over Perth Glory on 18 March 2012.

Central Coast Mariners
On 15 May 2012 he signed a deal with the Central Coast Mariners for the upcoming A-League season. Anderson, along with six teammates was released from his contract with the Mariners at the end of 2014–15 A-League season.

Sydney FC
On 14 July 2015 Zachary signed a one-year deal with Sydney FC for the 2015-16 A-League season, rejoining former manager Graham Arnold, coaches Andrew Clark and John Crawley and former teammate Matt Simon who was also released from the Mariners at the conclusion 2015–16 season. He made his competitive debut for Sydney in a loss to Urawa Red Diamonds in the 2016 AFC Champions League. In late May 2016, it was announced that Anderson would not be returning to the club after the 2015–16 season.

Emirates Club
In June 2016, Anderson was announced as a new signing for UAE Arabian Gulf League side Emirates Club, signing a two-year deal. He was released from his contract after 6 months at the club, playing only 4 games and conceding 10 goals.

Kedah FA
Anderson moved to Malaysian Super League side Kedah FA in early 2017, following the footsteps of Sydney FC teammate Shane Smeltz who joined in 2016. He was able to help the club to a 4th place league finish as well as winning the Malaysian FA Cup. On 16 September 2017, Anderson announced on his Instagram that he would be leaving the club alongside striker Ken Ilsø to pursue other opportunities.

Perak TBG F.C.
After a stint with PKNS FC, it was announced on 26 December 2018 that Anderson had signed for Perak TBG F.C.

Hougang United
On 28 January 2020, Anderson joined Singapore Premier League side Hougang United FC for the 2020 season.

Olympic FC
In March 2022, Olympic FC announced that Anderson had retired from football to focus on his business, First Eleven Club.

International career
On 7 March 2012 he was selected to represent the Australia Olympic football team in an Asian Olympic Qualifier match against Iraq.

Career statistics

Honours

Club
Gold Coast United FC
National Youth League Championship: 2009–10

Central Coast Mariners
A-League Championship: 2012–13

Kedah FA
Sultan Haji Ahmad Shah Cup: 2017
 Malaysia FA Cup: 2017

See also 
 List of Central Coast Mariners FC players
 List of Gold Coast United FC players

References

External links

1991 births
Living people
Association football defenders
Australian soccer players
Australia under-20 international soccer players
Gold Coast United FC players
Central Coast Mariners FC players
Sydney FC players
Emirates Club players
Kedah Darul Aman F.C. players
A-League Men players
UAE Pro League players
Malaysia Super League players
People from North Queensland
Australian expatriate soccer players
Expatriate footballers in the United Arab Emirates
Australian expatriate sportspeople in the United Arab Emirates
Expatriate footballers in Malaysia
Australian expatriate sportspeople in Malaysia
People educated at Brisbane Boys' College